Cannabis consumption in pregnancy may or may not be associated with restrictions in growth of the fetus, miscarriage, and cognitive deficits. The American Congress of Obstetricians and Gynecologists recommended that cannabis use be stopped before and during pregnancy. There has not been any official link between birth defects and marijuana use. Cannabis is the most commonly used illicit substance among pregnant women.

Cannabis has an ancient tradition of usage as a medicine in obstetrics and gynecology, and a comprehensive historical review find that cannabis extracts, may represent an efficacious and safe alternative for treatment of a wide range of conditions in women including dysmenorrhea, dysuria, hyperemesis gravidarum, and menopausal symptoms.

Endocannabinoid system

The role of the endocannabinoid system (ECS) in female fertility has long been suspected and studied.  Most studies through 2013 linking development of the fetus and cannabis show effects of consumption during the gestational period, but abnormalities in the endocannabinoid system during the phase of placental development are also linked with problems in pregnancy. According to Sun and Dey (2012), endocannabinoid signaling plays a role in "female reproductive events, including preimplantation embryo development, oviductal embryo transport, embryo implantation, placentation, and parturition".  Karusu et al (2011) said that a "clear correlation ... in the actual reproductive tissues of miscarrying versus healthy women has yet to be established. However, the adverse effects of marijuana smoke and THC on reproductive functions point to processes that are modulated by ECS.". 

Recent data indicates that endometrial expression of cannabinoid receptors in marijuana smoking mothers is higher than non-smokers. Keimpema and colleagues (2011) said, "Prenatal cannabis exposure can lead to growth defects during formation of the nervous system"; "[c]annabis impacts the formation and functions of neuronal circuitries by targeting cannabinoid receptors ... By indiscriminately prolonging the "switched-on" period of cannabinoid receptors, cannabis can hijack endocannabinoid signals to evoke molecular rearrangements, leading to the erroneous wiring of neuronal networks".  A report prepared for the Australian National Council on Drugs concluded cannabis and other cannabinoids are contraindicated in pregnancy as they may interact with the endocannabinoid system.

Research

Although conclusions cannot be drawn from existing data, there is some evidence that prenatal exposure to cannabis may be associated with deficits in language, attention, cognitive performance, and delinquent behaviors. THC exposure in rats during the prenatal developmental phase may cause epigenetic changes in gene expression, but there is limited knowledge about the risk for psychiatric disorders because of ethical barriers to studying the developing human brain. While animal studies cannot take into account factors that could influence the effects of cannabis on human maternal exposure, such as environmental and social factors, a 2011 review of rodent studies by Campolongo et al. said there was "... increasing evidence from animal studies showing that cannabinoid drugs ... induce enduring neurobehavioral abnormalities in the exposed offspring ..."  Campolongo et al. added that "clinical studies report hyperactivity, cognitive impairments and altered emotionality in humans exposed in utero to cannabis". Martin et al. investigated recent trends in substance abuse treatment admissions for cannabis use in pregnancy in the US, based on Treatment Episodes Data Set (TEDS) from 1992 to 2012, and discovered that, while the proportion of treatment admissions for pregnant women was stable (about 4%), the admissions for women who were pregnant and reported any marijuana use grew from 29% to 43%. A 2015 review found that cannabis use by pregnant mothers corresponded to impaired brain maturation in their children, and that those children were more predisposed to neurodevelopmental disorders; these results do not demonstrate causality.

The National Institute on Drug Abuse states that further research is required to "disentangle" effects of cannabis use from a mother's concomitant drug use and other environmental factors. A 2016 meta-analysis showed that after accounting for confounding factors, cannabis alone was not responsible for adverse neonatal outcomes.

Pregnancy and miscarriage by endocannabinoids 
The endocannabinoid (EC), a N-acylethanolamine (NAE), Anandamide (AEA: C22H37NO2; 20:4, ω-6), that is synthesized "on demand", is the key to a successful pregnancy and outcome, by a temporary low amount, coursed by high FAAH activity, at the uterine lining. The lower AEA content uses the CB1 receptors, that are at high levels on the blastocyst (fertilized egg), to make the attachment to the lining of the uterus. Another study have also shown, that healthy women, with higher lymphocyte FAAH, have lower blood AEA compared to aborting women.

As low level of AEA, called on and synthesized "on demand" if needed to activate related receptors, and broken down by FAAH, is necessary for attachment and prevention of miscarriage, and abortion, it is found that the phytocannabinoid Δ9-tetrahydrocannabinol (THC: C21H30O2), that can mimic "the called" AEA activation at CB1 and CB2 receptors, is able to lower blood AEA (and the demand for it) by a biphasic reaction. Anandamide (AEA) reach maximal values at 30 min., as it increase slightly from 0.58 ± 0.21 ng/ml at baseline to 0.64 ± 0.24 ng/ml (p < 0.05). After reaching maximal concentrations, the EC plasma levels (also 2-Arachidonoylglycerol (2-AG: C23H38O4; 20:4, ω-6) decrease markedly to a nadir of 300 min after THC administration, to 0.32 ± 0.15 ng/ml for anandamide, and the plasma concentrations returned to near baseline levels until 48 hours after the experiment in 25 healthy volunteers, who received a large intravenous dose of THC (0.10 mg/kg).

The endocannabinoid-CB1-receptor system is found unique in its absolute control over the initiation of the milk suckling response in new-borns, and it is further proposed that cannabis-based medicines should be developed to benefit infant failure to thrive.

Developmental observations suggest that CB1 receptors develop only gradually during the postnatal period, which block for the psychoactive effects of cannabinoid treatment in the young organism. Therefore, it is suggested that children may respond positively to medicinal applications of cannabinoids without undesirable central effects. Clinical results have been reported in pediatric oncology and in case studies of children with severe neurological disease or brain trauma, and cystic fibrosis (CF) suggesting cannabinoid treatment for children or young adults, in order to achieve an improvement of their health condition including improved food intake and reduced inflammatory exacerbations. In CF mice treated with THC in infancy show normal motor activity and anxiety levels in adulthood. As the etiology of CF is associated with an imbalance of fatty acids (n6 and n3), and therefore assumed, that endocannabinoid activity, which plays an important role in fertility, is disrupted and could be one of the causes of infertility, a study find CF males treated with THC fully fertile, producing offspring comparable by the number of litters and the number of pups with wild-type mice, and there counterparts, not treated, were completely infertile. Thereby, mild stimulation of the endocannabinoid system in infancy and adolescence appears to normalize many reproductive processes and prevent infertility in CF males.

Morning sickness/hyperemesis gravidarum 
Hyperemesis Gravidarum (HG), is a debilitating ailment characterized by severe nausea and vomiting, malnutrition, and weight loss during pregnancy, and occurs to 1-2% of pregnant women globally. It is a perplexing female mystery for the present-day medical establishment. The frustration is mostly felt by women who are survivors of HG, desperately searching for a cure and increased understanding of this disease. Several pregnant women have revealed their personal experience with cannabis, having used it to relieve symptoms of HG, who would otherwise have become severely emaciated, dehydrated, and malnourished due to persistent, uncontrollable vomiting and the inability to eat and drink in their pregnancy.

See also
Drugs in pregnancy
N-acylethanolamine (NAE)

References

Obstetrics
Pregnancy
Drugs and pregnancy